The 1958–59 West Virginia Mountaineers men's basketball team represented West Virginia University in NCAA competition in the 1958–59 season. Coached by Fred Schaus and led by Hall of Fame guard Jerry West, the Mountaineers, then a member of the Southern Conference, lost in the final of that year's NCAA tournament to California.

Season Summary
West Virginia wasn’t a one-man team, far from it, but guard Jerry West was the star of the show, as he proved after leading the mountaineers to the final four. He scored 38 points and grabbed 15 rebounds in a semifinal win over Louisville, then scored 28 points and snared 11 boards against California in the title game. That effort wasn’t enough to prevent the Bears from winning, by a single point, 71-70.

NCAA basketball tournament
East
 West Virginia 82, Dartmouth 68
 West Virginia 95, St. Joseph’s, Pennsylvania 92
 West Virginia 86, Boston 82
Final Four
 West Virginia 94, Louisville 79
 California 71, West Virginia 70

Team players drafted into the NBA

References

External links
Official Site

West Virginia Mountaineers men's basketball seasons
West Virginia
Southern Conference men's basketball champion seasons
NCAA Division I men's basketball tournament Final Four seasons
West Virginia
West Virginia Mountaineers men's b
West Virginia Mountaineers men's b